Mathukumalli is a village in Savalyapuram mandal of Guntur district in Andhra Pradesh, India.

Villages in Guntur district